Hermes Silva (born 14 October 1950) is a Nicaraguan boxer. He competed in the men's bantamweight event at the 1968 Summer Olympics. At the 1968 Summer Olympics, he lost to Kenneth Campbell of Jamaica.

References

1950 births
Living people
Nicaraguan male boxers
Olympic boxers of Nicaragua
Boxers at the 1968 Summer Olympics
Bantamweight boxers